Stefan Donchev (born 28 August 1975 in Varna) is a former Bulgarian footballer who played as a defender.

Career statistics
As of 23 December 2010

References

1975 births
Living people
Bulgarian footballers
First Professional Football League (Bulgaria) players
PFC Ludogorets Razgrad players
PFC Spartak Varna players
PFC Levski Sofia players
FC Atyrau players
FC Lokomotiv 1929 Sofia players
Bulgarian expatriate sportspeople in Kazakhstan
Expatriate footballers in Kazakhstan
Association football defenders
Sportspeople from Varna, Bulgaria